Irina Petrovna Kupchenko (born 1 March 1948 in Vienna) is a Soviet and Russian stage and film actress. She rose to prominence after acting in Andrei Konchalovsky's 1969 movie adaptation of A Nest of Gentry. She has performed in more than forty films since 1969.

Her performance in Lonely Woman Seeks Life Companion won her a Best Actress award at the Montreal World Film Festival.

She also played Alexandre in The Last Night of the Last Tsar, a play that was based on the book The Last Tsar: The Life and Death of Nicholas II by Edvard Radzinsky.

Biography
She was born in Vienna in a military family that, after the withdrawal of the Soviet Army in Austria (1955), moved to Kyiv. In childhood, Irina showed an interest in ballet. After high school, she initially studied foreign languages at the University of Kyiv, but after her debut in the role of Liza in A Nest of Gentlefolk, she decided to pursue a career in acting. She graduated from the Shchukin Theatre Institute in Moscow (1970) and began working in the Moscow Vakhtangov Theatre (1971).

Personal life
She was married to actor Vasily Lanovoy until his death in 2021.

Honors and awards
 Honored Artist of the RSFSR (1980)
Lenin Komsomol Prize (1981)
 People's Artist of the RSFSR (1989)
 Order of Honour (1999)
 State Prize of the Russian Federation (2002)
Order of Friendship (2019)

Selected filmography

References

External links

1948 births
20th-century Russian actresses
21st-century Russian actresses
Living people
Actresses from Vienna
Academicians of the National Academy of Motion Picture Arts and Sciences of Russia
Honored Artists of the RSFSR
People's Artists of the RSFSR
Recipients of the Lenin Komsomol Prize
Recipients of the Nika Award
Recipients of the Order of Honour (Russia)
State Prize of the Russian Federation laureates
Russian film actresses
Russian stage actresses
Russian television actresses
Soviet film actresses
Soviet stage actresses
Soviet television actresses